Bad Münster am Stein-Ebernburg is a former Verbandsgemeinde ("collective municipality") in the district of Bad Kreuznach, Rhineland-Palatinate, Germany. On 1 January 2017 it was disbanded, and its member municipalities were divided over the Verbandsgemeinden Rüdesheim and Bad Kreuznach. The seat of the Verbandsgemeinde was in Bad Münster am Stein-Ebernburg, itself not part of the Verbandsgemeinde anymore since 1 July 2014.

The Verbandsgemeinde Bad Münster am Stein-Ebernburg consisted of the following Ortsgemeinden ("local municipalities"):

 Altenbamberg
 Duchroth
 Feilbingert
 Hallgarten
 Hochstätten
 Niederhausen
 Norheim
 Oberhausen an der Nahe
 Traisen

Former Verbandsgemeinden in Rhineland-Palatinate